Calliotropis virginiae is a species of sea snail, a marine gastropod mollusk in the family Eucyclidae.

Description
The size of the shell varies between 6 mm and 10 mm.

Distribution
This marine species occurs off the Philippines.

References

 Vilvens C. (2007) New records and new species of Calliotropis from Indo-Pacific. Novapex 8 (Hors Série 5): 1–72.

External links
 

virginiae
Gastropods described in 2006